The Two of Us is an American television sitcom starring Peter Cook and Mimi Kennedy that aired on CBS from April 6, 1981, to February 24, 1982. It is a remake of the British LWT sitcom Two's Company (1975–1979).

Synopsis
Cook plays an English butler named Brentwood, who works for a single American mother, Nan Gallagher (Kennedy). Dana Hill played Nan's 12-year-old daughter, Gabby.

Cast
 Peter Cook as Robert Brentwood
 Mimi Kennedy as Nan Gallagher
 Oliver Clark as Cubby Royce
 Dana Hill as Gabby Gallagher 
 Tim Thomerson as Reggie Cavanaugh

Episodes

Season 1 (1981)

Season 2 (1981–82)

External links
 
 
 
 

1980s American sitcoms
1981 American television series debuts
1982 American television series endings
American television series based on British television series
CBS original programming
English-language television shows
Television series by CBS Studios